Lakeville is a community in the Canadian province of New Brunswick. This small village is located between Centreville and Woodstock. It is located on Route 560 in Carleton County. It has two churches, a convenience store, a post office, a fire hall, a park, and a community center.  In the center of this village is the Williamstown Lake.

Education
Students from the area are bused to Centreville for education levels Kindergarten through grade 8. Grades 9 through 12 attend Carleton North High School in Bristol.

History

Notable people

See also
List of communities in New Brunswick

References

Communities in Carleton County, New Brunswick
Designated places in New Brunswick